This article is about the particular significance of the year 1957 to Wales and its people.

Incumbents

Minister of Welsh Affairs – Henry Brooke
Archbishop of Wales
John Morgan, Bishop of Llandaff (died 26 June)
Edwin Morris, Bishop of Monmouth (elected)
Archdruid of the National Eisteddfod of Wales
Dyfnallt (outgoing)
William Morris (incoming)

Events
18 January – Nigel Birch is appointed Economic Secretary to the Treasury.
25 February – Goronwy Rees, Principal of the University of Wales College Aberystwyth, resigns following allegations that he has spied for the Soviet Union.
28 February – Carmarthen by-election is held following the death of Sir Rhys Hopkin Morris the previous year. The Liberal Party lose the seat to Labour's Lady Megan Lloyd George, herself a former Liberal MP.
1 July – Royal physician Horace Evans is created 1st Baron Evans of Merthyr Tydfil.
6 July – The Royal Welsh Show is held at Blaendolau; the showground is flooded to a depth of 1 metre.
16 July – Five people drown in a boating accident at Barmouth.
31 July – The Tryweryn Bill, permitting Liverpool City Council to build a reservoir which will drown the village of Capel Celyn, becomes law.
8 September – The town hall at Aberystwyth is seriously damaged by fire.
21 November – Morgan Phillips and Aneurin Bevan, along with Richard Crossman, successfully sue The Spectator for libel.
12 December – Wales gets its own minister of state in the Westminster government for the first time. Prime Minister Harold Macmillan rejects requests for a Secretary of State.
date unknown – Brecon Beacons becomes the third of Wales's national parks.

Arts and literature
5 October – Paul Robeson (blacklisted at this time from travelling outside the United States) addresses the Miners' Eisteddfod at the Grand Pavilion, Porthcawl via a transatlantic telephone link to the miners' leader Will Paynter.

Awards

National Eisteddfod of Wales (held in Llangefni)
National Eisteddfod of Wales: Chair – Gwilym Tilsley, "Cwm Carnedd"
National Eisteddfod of Wales: Crown – Dyfnallt Morgan, "Drama Fydryddol Rhwng Dau"
National Eisteddfod of Wales: Prose Medal – Tom Parri Jones, Teisennau Berffro

New books

Welsh language
Käte Bosse-Griffiths – Mae'r Galon wrth y Llyw
Islwyn Ffowc Elis – Wythnos Yng Nghymru Fydd
Bobi Jones – Y Gân Gyntaf
T. Harri Jones – The Enemy in the Heart
W. Leslie Richards – Telyn Teilo
Gwilym Tilsley – Y glöwr a cherddi eraill

English language
John Charles – King of Soccer
Rhys Davies – The Perishable Quality
Trevor Ford – I Lead the Attack
Dick Francis – The Sport of Queens

New drama
Albert Evans-Jones – Absalom Fy Mab

Music
Shirley Bassey – Banana Boat Song (her first chart single)
Alun Hoddinott – Harp Concerto (written for Osian Ellis)
Daniel Jones – String Quartet 1957

Film
Donald Houston stars in The Girl in the Picture.

Broadcasting
Alun Oldfield-Davies becomes senior regional BBC controller, after several years of successful campaigning for Welsh-language television.

Welsh-language television
February – Cefndir (first regular Welsh-language programme)
September – Dewch i Mewn (magazine programme)

English-language television
Adaptation of Dylan Thomas's Under Milk Wood, starring Donald Houston and William Squire.

Sport
Football
Swansea-born John Charles transfers from Leeds United to Juventus of Turin for a transfer fee of £65,000 (almost double the previous British record)
Pelé scores a hattrick against Wales
BBC Wales Sports Personality of the Year – Dai Rees
Inaugural Glamorgan County Silver Ball Trophy competition held; Taibach RFC are champions.

Births
10 March – Terry Holmes, rugby player
19 March (in Birmingham) – Jane Davidson, AM, politician
20 April – Geraint Wyn Davies, actor
26 April – Edwina Hart AM, politician
8 May – Eddie Butler, rugby union player and commentator (died 2022)
17 May – Anne Main, educator and politician
12 June – Javed Miandad, former Glamorgan cricketer
1 July – Wayne David MP, politician
20 July – Chris Bromham, stuntman
11 August – Leighton Andrews AM, politician
11 October 
(in Holyhead) Dawn French, actress and comedian
Jon Langford, musician
10 November – Nigel Evans MP, politician
21 December – Roger Blake, actor
Charlotte Voake, children's illustrator

Deaths
6 March – Gwladys Evan Morris, actress and writer, 77 
21 March – Russell Thomas, doctor, lawyer and politician, 60
30 July – William Richard Arnold, rugby player, 76
26 June – John Morgan, Archbishop of Wales and Bishop of Llandaff, 71
1 August – Llewellyn Lloyd, Wales international rugby union player, 80
15 August – Alice Williams, writer, painter and voluntary worker, 94
20 August – Edward Evans, 1st Baron Mountevans, explorer and admiral, 75
12 September – Tom Pearson, Wales national rugby player, 85
26 September – Arthur Powell Davies, Unitarian minister and writer, 55
10 October – Lloyd Davies, footballer, 80
12 November – Wilfred Hodder, Wales international rugby player, 61
7 December
Maurice Jones, priest and academic, 94
Alfred Ernest Watkins, footballer, 79
9 December – Llewellyn Gwynne, first bishop of Egypt and Sudan, 94

See also
1957 in Northern Ireland

References